Mikhail Eduardovich Oseevsky (born 30 November 1960) is a Russian politician, a member of United Russia party. From 2003 to 2012, he was the Vice-governor of Saint Petersburg and the Minister of Finance in the Saint Petersburg City Administration, appointed to these positions by then-governor, Valentina Matvienko. From 2010 to 2012, he was also the Head of the Administration of the St. Petersburg Governor. On 6 January 2012, he was appointed Deputy-Minister of Economic Development of Russia.

Biography 
Mikhail Oseevsky born in Leningrad to Eduard Oseevskiy in November 1960.

From March to April 1983, he worked in the Leningrad Polytechnic Institute named after Mikhail Kalinin. Until 1986, he was secretary of the Komsomol committee of the faculty of electrical mechanics of the Leningrad Polytechnic Institute and was a senior engineer.

From 1986 to 1993, he was an engineer in the "Elktrofizika" company.

From 1993 to 1999, he was deputy director of the Stock Exchange in St. Petersburg and served as a member of the expert council of the Federal Securities Commission of Russia. In September 1999, he was a Vice Chairman of the Board Council of the Industrial and Construction Bank (Промышленно-строительный банк) in Saint Petersburg.

In November 2003, he was appointed as a Vice-Governor of St. Petersburg and became economic advisor of Valentina Matvienko. In the 2000s, he was involved with the city's economic development.

In November 2005, he was chairman of the board of the company "Metrokum" and a director of VEB-Invest Bank. In June 2010, he was appointed as head of Administration of the governor of Saint Petersburg and was a founder of the National Competition of the most successful businessmen of Russia, held annually since 2010.

In 2008, he traveled to Israel and led a delegation of 160 people to sign a cooperation agreement between the Government of Saint Petersburg city and the Haifa municipality: this was the first cooperation agreement of its kind signed between a Russian city and an Israeli city.

Since being appointed vice-governor of the city, he was one of the organizers of the St. Petersburg International Economic Forum. In June 2011, he was the chairman of the Coordination Committee for Preparing and Holding the St. Petersburg International Economic Forum.

On 23 August 2011, the United Russia party greeted him as a candidate for governor of Saint Petersburg city, along with Vadim Tyulpanov and Georgy Poltavchenko, but the President chose Georgy Poltavchenko as his favorite candidate.

On 6 January 2012, Dmitry Medvedev appointed him as Deputy-Minister of Economic Development of Russia.

Sanctions 
On 8 March 2022, Oseevsky was set on a list of sanctions by European Union.

Family
Mikhail is married with two sons.

References

External links
Short biography in Russian
Oseevskiy In Twitter

1960 births
Living people
Russian economists
Russian politicians
Russian individuals subject to European Union sanctions